Peter Nigel Huxford (born 17 February 1960) is an English former first-class cricketer.

Huxford was born at Enfield in February 1960. He later studied at Christ Church College at the University of Oxford. While studying at Oxford, he played first-class cricket for Oxford University in 1980–81, making seven appearances. Playing as a wicket-keeper, he scored 27 runs and took three catches and made two stumpings.

References

External links

1960 births
Living people
People from Enfield, London
Alumni of Christ Church, Oxford
English cricketers
Oxford University cricketers